Ti mou stelneis grammata  is an anonymous Cappadocian Greek folk tune (Kasik Havasi  or Χορός κουταλιών ).

Original form
The original form of the song was popular in Cappadocia with Cappadocian Greeks.

See also
Music of Greece
Vassilis Tsitsanis

References

Greek songs
Songwriter unknown
Year of song unknown